"I Might Be Crying" is a song by British singer-songwriter Tanita Tikaram, which was released in 1995 as the lead single from her fifth studio album Lovers In The City.

The song, which was written and produced by Tikaram, features backing vocals by Jennifer Warnes. "I Might Be Crying" peaked at No. 64 on the UK Singles Chart. One of the single's B-sides, "Not Waving but Drowning", is a poem by Stevie Smith set to music.

Background
Speaking to the Courier-Post in 1995, Tikaram said of the song: "It's about the idea of being haunted by someone. It's about never really knowing what you have until you lose it."

Music video
The song's music video was filmed in Vietnam and took a week to shoot. Tikaram told the Courier-Post: "It was really hot and poor. There's no sanitation and no real infrastructure. I took my mother along on the shoot and she said, 'This is what it was like for us 50 years ago.' I thought it was good that she came and said, 'This is part of your past.'"

Critical reception
Upon its release, Andrew Balkin of the Kingston Informer gave the single a one star rating and commented: "The woman with the humour bypass has excelled herself with an even more drab and dreary offering than usual. Needless to say, this will not win Miss Tikaram any new fans, and could even lose her some old ones." Jeff Hall of the Courier-Post considered the song "destined to be a breakout classic". He commented: "Perhaps the most exquisite pop song released so far this year, 'I Might Be Crying' combines a brooding drum/keyboard pulse and luxurious string arrangement with an ethereal vocal chant and Tikaram's own breathy delivery."

In a review of Lovers in the City, Len Righi of The Morning Call commented: "'I Might Be Crying' is an effective meditation on loss and regret, with Tikaram pairing her crushed-but-not-quite-broken voice with a primitive hip-hop rhythm in a chat-like African spiritual." Darryl Cater of AllMusic noted the song's "inventive arrangement in which a full string and brass orchestra merely underscores a sweeping landscape of vocal harmonies".

Track listing
Cassette single
"I Might Be Crying" - 3:54
"Five Feet Away" - 4:09

CD single
"I Might Be Crying" - 3:54
"Five Feet Away" - 4:09
"Not Waving but Drowning" - 3:52

CD single (US promo)
"I Might Be Crying" (Album Version) - 3:55

Personnel
 Tanita Tikaram - lead vocals, backing vocals
 Jennifer Warnes - vocal chant
 The Valentini Strings - orchestra
 Thomas Newman - conductor, arrangement
 Chris "Snake" Davies - saxophone
 Noel Langley - trumpet
 Neil Sidwell - trombone
 Stevie Williams - bass, percussion, drum programming

Production
 Tanita Tikaram - producer
 Steve Price - engineering, mixing
 Tim Young - mastering

Other
 Farrington Associates - design
 Jean-Baptiste Mondino - photography

Charts

References

1995 songs
1995 singles
Tanita Tikaram songs
Songs written by Tanita Tikaram
East West Records singles